Mark Clifford Serreze (born 1960) is an American geographer and the director of the National Snow and Ice Data Center (NSIDC), a project of the Cooperative Institute for Research in Environmental Sciences at the University of Colorado Boulder. He officially became the NSIDC's director in August 2009. In 2019, he was named a Distinguished Professor in the Department of Geography. Serreze is primarily known for his expertise in the Arctic sea ice decline that has occurred over the last few decades due to global warming, a topic about which he has expressed serious concern.

Early life and education
Serreze grew up in Maine, and credits its frequent snowy weather as an inspiration for his interest in studying ice. He received his PhD from the University of Colorado Boulder in 1989.

Views on sea ice and global warming
In 2007, Serreze said that given the increasingly rapid rate at which Arctic ice has been melting, he thought it was "very reasonable" to expect the Arctic to be ice-free by 2030. He also blamed the decline primarily on anthropogenic global warming. Serreze became well known in 2008 when he described the state of Arctic sea ice as being in a "death spiral", and said it could disappear in the summers within several decades. Also that year, when contacted by the Associated Press, Serreze described the state of Arctic sea ice as being at a "tipping point," after which sea ice will plummet rapidly and added that 2007's then-record low sea ice levels were due in part to wind currents and other weather conditions as well as global warming.  

In regards to Antarctic sea ice extent, Serreze noted in an interview 2012 that it is known since years that Arctic sea ice vanishes first, and thus it is not a surprise that observations do not show big reductions and Antarctic sea ice doesn't disprove global warming.

Media appearances
In 2006 he was featured in the Discovery Channel documentary Global Warming: What You Need to Know.

See also
Climate change in the Arctic

Publications
 Serreze, Mark C. (2018) Brave New Arctic: The Untold Story of the Melting North. Princeton University Press. .

References

Living people
1960 births
American geographers
University of Colorado Boulder alumni
University of Colorado Boulder faculty